Formparanate (chemical formula: C12H17N3O2) is a chemical compound used in acaricides and insecticides.

See also
 Formetanate

References

Acetylcholinesterase inhibitors
Carbamate insecticides
Amidines
Acaricides
Aromatic carbamates